Outpatient commitment—also called assisted outpatient treatment (AOT) or community treatment orders (CTO)—refers to a civil court procedure wherein a legal process orders an individual diagnosed with a severe mental disorder to adhere to an outpatient treatment plan designed to prevent further deterioration or recurrence that is harmful to themselves or others.

This form of involuntary treatment is distinct from involuntary commitment in that the individual subject to the order continues to live in their home community rather than being detained in hospital or incarcerated. The individual may be subject to rapid recall to hospital, including medication over objections, if the conditions of the order are broken, and the person's mental health deteriorates.  This generally means taking psychiatric medication as directed and may also include attending appointments with a mental health professional, and sometimes even not to take non-prescribed illicit drugs and not associate with certain people or in certain places deemed to have been linked to a deterioration in mental health in that individual.

The criteria and process for outpatient commitment are established by law, which vary among nations and, in the U.S. and Canada, among states or provinces. Some jurisdictions require court hearings, where a judge will make a court order, and others require that treating psychiatrists comply with a set of requirements before compulsory treatment is instituted. When a court process is not required, there is usually a form of appeal to the courts or appeal to or scrutiny by tribunals set up for that purpose. Community treatment laws have generally followed the worldwide trend of community treatment. See mental health law for details of countries which do not have laws that regulate compulsory treatment.

Terminology
In the United States the term "assisted outpatient treatment" (AOT) is often used and refers to a process whereby a judge orders a qualifying person with symptoms of severe untreated mental illness to adhere to a mental health treatment plan while living in the community. The plan typically includes medication and may include other forms of treatment as well. Patients are often monitored and assigned to case managers or a community dedicated to treating mental health known as assertive community treatment (ACT).

Australia, Canada, England, and New Zealand use the term "community treatment order" (CTO).

Comparison to inpatient commitment

The terminology, "outpatient commitment", and legal construction often equate outpatient commitment with inpatient commitment but providing the patient more freedom. In practice, outpatient commitment may be used in situations where commitment would not be used because it is cheaper than inpatient commitment; seen as less draconian; and protects mental health professionals from moral, civil or criminal liability.

Preventive use

Outpatient commitment is used in some countries to prevent relapse of mental disorders, as many mental disorders are episodic in nature (for example bipolar disorder or schizophrenia) and it can be difficult to predict whether a mental disorder will reoccur. Some countries use outpatient commitment for first episode psychosis (FEP).

Implementation
Discussions of "outpatient commitment" began in the psychiatry community in the 1980s following deinstitutionalization, a trend that led to the widespread closure of public psychiatric hospitals and resulted in the discharge of large numbers of people with mental illness to the community.

Europe

Denmark
Denmark introduced outpatient commitment in 2010 with the Mental Health Act.

Germany
In Germany, CTOs were resumed in 2015 (formerly only for forensic psychiatry).
Laws regarding implementations are distincts between lander.

France
The CTOs are renewed every month. They were introduced under Nicolas Sarkosy presidency. Persons committed are registered on a national file accessible by police, even if they are not suspected of breaking the law.

The Netherlands
 Dutch law provides for community treatment orders, and an individual who does not comply with the terms of their CTO may be subject to immediate involuntary commitment.

Norway
When Norway introduced outpatient commitment in the 1961 Mental Health Act, it could only be mandated for individuals who had previously been admitted for inpatient treatment. Revisions in 1999 and 2006 provided for outpatient commitment without previous inpatient treatment, but this provision is seldom used.

Sweden
In Sweden, the Compulsory Psychiatric Care Act provides for an administrative court to mandate psychiatric treatment to prevent harm to the individual or others. The law was created in 1991 and revised in 2008.

England and Wales
Changes in service provision and amendments to the Mental Health Act in England and Wales have increased the scope for compulsion in the community. The Mental Health Act 2007 introduced community treatment orders (CTOs). CTOs are legally defined as a form of outpatient leave for individuals detained under section 3 of the Mental Health Act. As such, only members of the medical community are involved in issuing a CTO, though both the section 3 detention underlying the CTO and the CTO itself can be appealed to the Mental Health Tribunal where a panel consisting of medical doctors and a judge will make a decision.The legislation in the UK specifically allows CTOs to be issued after a single admission to hospital for treatment. However, the Royal College of Psychiatrists suggested limiting CTOs to patients with a history of noncompliance and hospitalization, when it reviewed the current mental health legislation.

John Mayer Chamberlain argues that this legislation was triggered by the Killing of Jonathan Zito by an individual who had interactions with mental health services prior this event, which led the then conservative government to argue for CTOs.

A review of patient data in London found that the average duration of a CTO in the UK was 3 years. Black people in the UK are more than ten times as likely to be under a CTO as white people. Concerns have been raised about the inability of Independent mental health advocates (IHMAs) to provide services to those under CTOs, since IMHAs cannot make contact with service users under CTOs and case workers could act as gatekeepers not providing referrals.

In a 2021 paper reviewing the mental health act, the UK government proposed a new form of indefinite outpatient commitment allowing for deprivation of liberties an continuous supervision termed supervised discharge. This discharge would be reviewed yearly, and only apply to individuals who would not benefit from treatment in a hospital setting and would be based on risk. Further, this legislation would only apply to restricted patients who have been diverted to the mental health care system from courts.

Scotland

Scotland has a different community commitment regime from England and Wales introduced in the 2003 Mental Health Act. There is ongoing debate in the UK on the place of coercion and compulsion in community mental health care.

Luxembourg
Patients may be recalled if they don't abide to conditions on residence or medical supervision decided by a psychiatrist on discharge for 3 months after having been released from an involuntary commitment.

North America
In the last decade of the 20th century and the first of the 21st, "outpatient commitment" laws were passed in a number of U.S. states and jurisdictions in Canada.

Canada

In the mid-1990s, Saskatchewan became the first Canadian province to implement community treatment orders, and Ontario followed in 2000.  New Brunswick was the only province without legislation that provided for either CTOs or extended leave.

United States

 44 U.S. states had enacted some version of an outpatient commitment law. In some cases, passage of the laws followed widely publicized tragedies, such as the murders of Laura Wilcox and Kendra Webdale.

Oceania
Australia and New Zealand introduced community treatment orders in the 1980s and 1990s.

Australia
In the Australian state of Victoria, community treatment orders last for a maximum of twelve months but can be renewed after review by a tribunal.

Controversy

Proponents have argued that outpatient commitment improves mental health, increases the effectiveness of treatment, lowers incidence of homelessness, arrest, incarceration and hospitalization and reduces costs.  Opponents of outpatient commitment laws argue that they unnecessarily limit freedom, force people to ingest dangerous medications, impead on their human rights, or are applied with racial and socioeconomic biases.

Arguments for and proponents

While many outpatient commitment laws have been passed in response to violent acts committed by people with mental illness, most proponents involved in the outpatient commitment debate also make arguments based on the quality of life and cost associated with untreated mental illness and "revolving door patients" who experience a cycle of hospitalization, treatment and stabilization, release, and decompensation. While the cost of repeated hospitalizations is indisputable, quality-of-life arguments rest on an understanding of mental illness as an undesirable and dangerous state of being.  Outpatient commitment proponents point to studies performed in North Carolina and New York that have found some positive impact of court-ordered outpatient treatment.  Proponents include:  Substance Abuse and Mental Health Services Administration (SAMHSA), U.S. Department of Justice, Agency for Healthcare Research and Quality (AHRQ), U. S Department of Health and Human Services, American Psychiatric Association, National Alliance on Mental Illness, International Association of Chiefs of Police. SAMHSA included Assisted Outpatient Treatment in their National Registry of Evidence Based Program and Practices.  Crime Solutions:  Management Strategies to Reduce Psychiatric Readmissions. The Treatment Advocacy Center are an advocacy group that campaign for the use of outpatient commitment.

A systematic review in 2016 that looked at around 200 papers investigating effectiveness of CTOs for patient outcomes. It found that non-randomized trials had dramatically varying results and found that no randomized controlled trials showed any benefits to the patient for outpatient commitment apart from a reduction in the risk of being the victim of crime.

The same interventions can have different effects in different countries due to legal, bureaucratic and social factors.

Cost

Research published in 2013 showed that Kendra's Law in New York, which served about 2,500 patients at a cost of $32 million, had positive results in terms of net cost, reduced arrests. About $125 million is also spent annually on improved outpatient treatment for patients who are not subject to the law. In contrast to New York, despite wide adoption of outpatient commitment, the programs were generally not adequately funded.

"Although numerous AOT programs currently operate across the United States, it is clear that the intervention is vastly underutilized."

Arrests, danger, and violence
The National Institute of Justice considers assisted outpatient treatment an effective crime prevention program. Some studies in the US have found that AOT programs have reduced the chances of arrest. Kendra's Law has lowered risk of violent behaviors, reduced thoughts about suicide.

Outcomes and hospital admissions
AOT "programs improve adherence with outpatient treatment and have been shown to lead to significantly fewer emergency commitments, hospital admissions, and hospital days as well as a reduction in arrests and violent behavior."

74% fewer participants experienced homelessness. 77% fewer experienced psychiatric hospitalization. 56% reduction in length of hospitalization. 83% fewer experienced arrest. 87% fewer experienced incarceration. 49% fewer abused alcohol. 48% fewer abused drugs. Consumer participation and medication compliance improved. The number of individuals exhibiting good adherence to meds increased 51%. The number of individuals exhibiting good service engagement increased 103%. Consumer perceptions were positive. 75% reported that AOT helped them gain control over their lives. 81% said AOT helped them get and stay well. 90% said AOT made them more likely to keep appointments and take meds. 87% of participants said they were confident in their case manager's ability. 88% said they and their case manager agreed on what was important to work on.

In Nevada County, CA, AOT ("Laura's Law") decreased the number of psychiatric hospital days 46.7%, the number of incarceration days 65.1%, the number of homeless days 61.9%, and the number of emergency interventions 44.1%. Laura's Law implementation saved $1.81–$2.52 for every dollar spent, and receiving services under Laura's Law caused a "reduction in actual hospital costs of $213,300" and a "reduction in actual incarceration costs of $75,600."

In New Jersey, Kim Veith, director of clinical services at Ocean Mental Health Services, noted the AOT pilot program performed "beyond wildest dreams." AOT reduced hospitalizations, shortened inpatient stays, reduced crime and incarceration, stabilized housing, and reduced homelessness. Of clients who were homeless, 20% are now in supportive housing, 40% are in boarding homes, and 20% are living successfully with family members.

Writing in the British Journal of Psychiatry in 2013, Jorun Rugkåsa and John Dawson stated, "The current evidence from  suggests that  do not reduce readmission rates over 12 months."

"We find that New York State's AOT Program improves a range of important outcomes for its recipients, apparently without feared negative consequences to recipients."

"The increased services available under AOT clearly improve recipient outcomes, however, the AOT court order, itself, and its monitoring do appear to offer additional benefits in improving outcomes."

Effect on mental illness system

Access to services

In New York City net costs declined 50% in the first year after assisted outpatient treatment began and an additional 13% in the second year. In non-NYC counties, costs declined 62% in the first year and an additional 27% in the second year. This was in spite of the fact that psychotropic drug costs increased during the first year after initiation of assisted outpatient treatment, by 40% and 44% in the city and five-county samples, respectively. The increased community-based mental health costs were more than offset by the reduction in inpatient and incarceration costs. Cost declines associated with assisted outpatient treatment were about twice as large as those seen for voluntary services.

Race

Service engagement

Consumers approve.  Despite being under a court order to participate in treatment, current AOT recipients feel neither more positive nor more negative about their treatment experiences than comparable individuals who are not under AOT."

In Los Angeles, CA, the AOT pilot program reduced incarceration 78%, hospitalization 86%, hospitalization after discharge from the program 77%, and cut taxpayer costs 40%.

In North Carolina, AOT reduced the percentage of persons refusing medications to 30%, compared to 66% of patients not under AOT.

In Ohio, AOT increased attendance at outpatient psychiatric appointments from 5.7 to 13.0 per year. It increased attendance at day treatment sessions from 23 to 60 per year. "During the first 12 months of outpatient commitment, patients experienced significant reductions in visits to the psychiatric emergency service, hospital admissions, and lengths of stay compared with the 12 months before commitment."

In Arizona, "71% [of AOT patients] ... voluntarily maintained treatment contacts six months after their orders expired" compared with "almost no patients" who were not court-ordered to outpatient treatment.

In Iowa, "it appears as though outpatient commitment promotes treatment compliance in about 80% of patients... After commitment is terminated, about ¾ of that group remain in treatment on a voluntary basis."

Arguments against and opponents
Human rights advocate considers it a violation of freedom of thought or opinion, or views the use of neuroleptic as degrading treatment that can also impede on their right to work due to sometimes handicapping side effects. Other argue for a right of self-determination or self ownership, considering it a paternalistic approach that can be wrongly applied considering psychiatry criteria for diagnosis are very subjective backed by some studies questioning diagnosis (see Rosenhan experiment), the unlimited duration with often lack or no foresight to an end from the patient is also criticised. 
Some opponents dispute the effects of compulsory treatment as positive, questioning the methodology of studies that show effectiveness. Some point to disparities in the way these laws are applied.

Opponents claim they are giving medication to the patient, but there are no brain chemical imbalances to correct in "mental illness". Our ability to control ourselves and reason comes from the mind, and the brain is being reduced in size from the psychiatric medications.

The slippery slope argument of "If government bodies are given power, they will use it in excess." was proven when 350–450 CTOs were expected to be issued in 2008 and more than five times that number were issued in the first few months. Every year there are increasing numbers of people subject to CTO's.

The psychiatric survivors movement opposes compulsory treatment on the basis that the ordered drugs often have serious or unpleasant side-effects such as tardive dyskinesia, neuroleptic malignant syndrome, akathisia, excessive weight gain leading to diabetes, addiction, sexual side effects, increased risk of suicide and QT prolongation. The New York Civil Liberties Union has denounced what they see as racial and socioeconomic biases in the issuing of outpatient commitment orders. The main opponents to any kind of coercion, including the outpatient commitment and any other form of involuntary commitment, are Giorgio Antonucci and Thomas Szasz.

See also
US specific:
 Laura's Law
 MindFreedom International

General:
 Deinstitutionalisation
 Psychiatric reform in Italy
 Giorgio Antonucci

Notes

References

External links
 Treatment Advocacy Center
 Civil commitment laws and standards by state
 MindFreedom
 National Mental Health Consumers' Self-Help Clearinghouse
 Mental Illness Policy Org
 Kendra's Law
 Laura's Law

Psychosis
Mental health law
Deinstitutionalisation